Calathea petersenii is a species of plant in the Marantaceae family. It is endemic to Ecuador.  Its natural habitat is subtropical or tropical moist lowland forests.

References

Flora of Ecuador
petersenii
Critically endangered plants
Taxonomy articles created by Polbot